Tjeerd Pasma (24 June 1904 – 28 December 1944) was a Dutch modern pentathlete. He competed at the 1928 Summer Olympics.

References

1904 births
1944 deaths
Dutch male modern pentathletes
Olympic modern pentathletes of the Netherlands
Modern pentathletes at the 1928 Summer Olympics
People from Dantumadiel
Sportspeople from Friesland
Dutch civilians killed in World War II
Deaths by airstrike during World War II